The Pawłokoma massacre was a massacre on 3 March 1945 of Ukrainians by Polish forces in the village of Pawłokoma  west of Przemyśl. The Polish post Home Army (AK) unit was commanded by Lt. Józef Biss and aided by Polish men from surrounding villages; the atrocities committed were an act of reprisal to similar, though en masse, attacks carried out on Polish villagers by the Ukrainian Insurgent Army. Between 150 to 500 people were executed.

Background 
The background to the event was a four-way struggle between Ukrainian, Polish, German, and Soviet forces in the then predominantly Ukrainian region of Volhynia. Mass executions and violence led to the death of 30,000 Ukrainians and between 70,000 to 100,000 Poles between February 1943 and July 1944.

Massacre 
The Polish troops commanded by Lt. Józef Biss herded the Ukrainian villagers to the local church where they were shot. Following the mass shooting, the Poles dumped the bodies in pits at the village cemetery. According to Polish historian Zdzisław Konieczny, the unit killed 150 men. Other estimates of those killed range from 366 to 500.

Aftermath
In 1947, the Polish government launched Operation Vistula that deported Ukrainian residents of the area en masse. Propaganda in schools depicted Ukrainians as traitors, fascists, and "natural enemies" of Poles.

Commemoration 
During Ukrainian Prime Minister Viktor Yushchenko's visit to Poland in May 2006, a monument in memory for 366 victims was dedicated in the village.

See also
Massacres of Poles in Volhynia and Eastern Galicia
Sahryń massacre

References

External links
 Jan Maksymiuk: Ukraine, Poland Seek Reconciliation Over Grisly History in Radio Free Europe NEWS article, 12 May 2006

Poland–Ukraine relations
1945 in Ukraine
Massacres of Ukrainians during World War II
1945 in Poland
March 1945 events in Europe
Massacres in 1945
Military operations involving the Home Army
Anti-Ukrainian sentiment in Europe
Massacres of Ukrainians by Poles
Massacres in Ukraine